Daisy (originally named Spooks) was a canine actor who appeared in more than 50 Hollywood films during the 1930s and 1940s. He was especially well-known for appearing in the Blondie franchise.

Biography 
Daisy—a cocker spaniel–poodle-terrier mix—was originally named Spooks because his owners noted his timidness as a pup. Born around 1937, he was owned by dog trainer Rennie Renfro, who bought him for $3. He also learned tricks from legendary trainer Rudd Weatherwax.

Reportedly, Renfro and his pup made $1,000 a week, and Renfro used the money to buy them a house in Toluca Lake, California. He was also noted to have had a five-year feud with actress Rita Hayworth. His last known film appearance came in 1954.

Daisy and his "pups" had their own dog food brand that they made public appearances to promote.

Selected filmography 
 Blondie (1938)
 Blondie Meets the Boss (1939)
 Blondie Takes a Vacation (1939)
 Blondie Brings Up Baby (1939)
 Blondie on a Budget (1940)
 Blondie Has Servant Trouble (1940)
 Blondie Plays Cupid (1940)
 Blondie Goes Latin (1941)
 Blondie in Society (1941)
 Blondie Goes to College (1942)
 Blondie's Blessed Event (1942)
 Blondie for Victory (1942)
 It's a Great Life (1943)
 Footlight Glamour (1943)
 Leave It to Blondie (1945)
 Life with Blondie (1945)
 Blondie's Lucky Day (1946)
 Blondie Knows Best (1946)
 Blondie's Big Moment (1947)
 Blondie's Holiday (1947) (uncredited)
 Blondie in the Dough (1947)
 Blondie's Anniversary (1947)
 Blondie's Reward (1948)
 Fighting Back (1948)
 The Valiant Hombre (1948)
 Blondie's Secret (1948)
 Blondie's Big Deal (1949)
 Blondie Hits the Jackpot (1949)
 Blondie's Hero (1950)
 Beware of Blondie (1950)

References

External links 

Dog actors
1960 deaths
1937 births